Binegar railway station was a station on the Somerset and Dorset Joint Railway in the county of Somerset in England. Opened on 20 July 1874, the station consisted of two platforms, with a building on the down platform. There was a substantial goods yard with two sheds and sidings, controlled from a 24 lever signal box. Being the first station north of the line's summit at Masbury Binegar was also where locomotives used as banking engines on north-bound trains would drop off and cross the line ready to return south.

The station closed to goods in 1963: passenger services were withdrawn when the SDJR closed on 7 March 1966.

Accident

There were several fatalities in two accidents near this station in the 1880s.

The site today

The site is now occupied by a large private house.

Further reading

References

External links
https://web.archive.org/web/20070518103018/http://www.sdjr.net/locations/binegar.html
 Station on navigable O.S. map

Disused railway stations in Somerset
Former Somerset and Dorset Joint Railway stations
Railway stations in Great Britain opened in 1874
Railway stations in Great Britain closed in 1966
Beeching closures in England
Mendip District